Olle Wiklund (1914-1999) was a Swedish cross-country skier. In 1942, he won Vasaloppet., nine minutes before second-placed Bertil Melin, breaking the old Vasaloppet record, dated back to 1928, with two minutes.

Competing for IFK Bergvik at club level, he participated in Vasaloppet at some points.

References 

1914 births
1999 deaths
Swedish male cross-country skiers
Vasaloppet winners